Ruhingu is a village in Antsla Parish, Võru County in Estonia.

References

Villages in Võru County